is an original anime series produced by AIC and Aniplex. The series aired in Japan between July and September 2013, and was simulcast by Crunchyroll. A manga adaptation was serialized in the June 2013 issue of Square Enix's online magazine Gangan Online. A light novel adaptation written by Michiko Itō with illustrations by Gomoku Akatsuki was serialized from June 10, 2013 in the monthly magazine Newtype, published by Kadokawa Shoten. The story follows a group of magical girls whose powers and personalities are based on the Major Arcana as they fight monsters born from humans that succumbed to despair.

Plot
In a world plagued by the Daemonia, creatures that take advantage of the negative emotions of people and transform them into monsters, girls from 22 special bloodlines are chosen to wield the power of the Elemental Tarot and confront them. The story follows Akari Taiyo, a 12-year-girl who becomes the wielder of card "The Sun" and joins the mysterious organization "Sefiro Fiore" to confront the Daemonia along other card wielders. However, it does not take long for Akari to learn that with their duty comes an unbearable guilt, as to defeat the Daemonia, the humans afflicted by them must perish as well.

Characters

Main characters

Akari is a upbeat girl who aims to be a fortune teller like her late mother, making use of the Tarot deck inherited from her. Her card is "The Sun" and she fights wielding a flaming rapier. Thanks to the power of her card, plants close to her tend to grow at an accelerated rate. She soon gains the ability to hear a Daemonia's thoughts, which is transferred to others via touch, and that ability is revealed to be because her father had been possessed by a Daemonia. She is twelve years old.

Luna is a modest, shy girl who fights summoning magic vines and has healing powers. Her card is "The Moon." She seems to have a romantic interest in Akari, which appears to have stemmed from her admiration of her missing twin sister, Serena, and becomes jealous when Akari grows close with others. When Luna leaves Sefiro Fiore after Ginka's disappearance, Cerebrum poses as Akari in order to get close to her, forcing a Diabolic Tarot card into her body, turning her into a demonic wolf hybrid, but she regains her humanity after Akari makes a deal with Cerebrum. Afterwards she gains the ability to turn her fingers into wolf claws. She is twelve years old.

Seira is a calm, strict girl who fights with an icy bow and arrow. She has a firm hatred of Daemonia after her childhood friend, Manami, was killed by one of them. Her card is "The Star". She is thirteen years old.

Ginka is a blonde, cheerful girl who can summons coins which convert into a sword, an axe, shields and other weapons. Her card is "Temperance". She is thirteen years old. Her father mentions that Ginka's aunt held the Power of the Temperance card prior to Ginka. She disappears when she destroys her counterpart Daemonia, and then returns in episode 12 to save Seira and Luna after hearing Akari's voice.

Sefiro Fiore Nagataki Branch

The head of the Sefiro Fiore Nagataki Branch, she has a kind and polite attitude and is the literature teacher. She follows the order of the Sefiro Fiore, but often doesn't agree with them, wanting to put her students first. Her card is "The World".

The deputy head of the Sefiro Fiore Nagataki Branch, she has a strict demeanor. Her card is "Judgement" and she is the P.E. teacher.

A woman armed with magic daggers. Her card is "The Fool" and she is the music teacher.

A woman armed with an artifact resembling a Jack-o'-lantern. Her card is "The Magician" and she is the chemistry teacher.

 

Three homunculus girls who work at the command center of the Sefiro Fiore Nagataki Branch. They conduct various research experiments and use a dimensional device to send the Elemental Tarot users to the location of a Daemonia attack. Their card is "Wheel of Fortune".

A talking crow who provides counseling to Etia.

A talking cat and Laplace' companion.

Other characters

Akari's cousin. She is a bookish honors student whose jealousy of Akari for the attention she gets for her fortune telling talent leads her to be possessed by a Daemonia. She transforms into a plant monster and is unwittingly killed by Akari, with her existence erased as if she never existed.

Akari's late mother and a fortune teller. She was a member of Sefiro Fiore and the previous wielder of "The Sun". For some reason, she did not teach her daughter to use her powers as she wanted her to live a normal life. She is the protagonist of the light novel prequel.

A woman who works at Akari's fortune teller shop.

A young woman who works with Mama Nagataki.

Another fortune teller who works with Mama Nagataki.

Ginka's father who used to live in poverty with his daughter until he manages to get from rags to riches with a successful business and is now one of the sponsors of Sefiro Fiore's activities.

A shapeshifting villain who tempts people to become Daemonia in order to collect their souls.

A corrupt politician Cerebrum aids from time to time.

A character from the light novel. She is a member of Sefiro Fiore and a comrade of Hinata, and her card is "The Lovers." She uses a crossbow in her Tenebrae form.

A character from the light novel. He is a Daemonia researcher for Sefiro Fiore and is implied to be Akari's father.

Media

Light novel
A light novel written by Michiko Itō and illustrated by Gomoku Akatsuki was serialized by Kadokawa Shoten in the magazine Newtype, and five chapters were published between June 10, 2013 and October 10, 2013. It is entitled , and it is a prequel to the anime series, focusing on Akari's mother Hinata Taiyo.

A web novel titled  with illustrations by Ryu Knight was also serialized, and it focuses on Silvia Leonhart, wielder of the Justice card. A volume collecting the chapters was released along with a revised version of Scattered and Spilled Sands of Fate and a drama CD. A third web novel, titled , serves as an epilogue and includes characters from both the television anime and The Silver That Dances in the Illusion web novel.

Manga
A manga adaptation illustrated by Kōki Katō began serialization in Square Enix's Gangan Online magazine on June 27, 2013 and ended on February 20, 2014. The sixteen chapters have been collected into four bound volumes, with the first being released on July 22, 2013, the second on September 27, 2013, and the third and fourth on March 22, 2014.

Volume list

Radio show
A radio show to promote the series titled  began broadcasting via the anime's official website on June 27, 2013. The show is hosted by Sora Tokui and Yuiko Tatsumi, who voice Luna and Ginka respectively.

Anime
An anime television by AIC aired in Japan between July 6, 2013 and September 28, 2013 and was simulcast by Crunchyroll. The opening theme is "Träumerei" by LiSA and the ending theme is "Mirage" by Natsumi Okamoto. The series is licensed in North America by Aniplex of America. A fourteenth episode was streamed on Niconico on November 16, 2013 and was included with the fourth BD/DVD released on December 25, 2013.

Episode list

Reception
Rebecca Silverman of Anime News Network gave the first half of the series an overall rating of B, praising the series' powerful moments and the accuracy of the depiction of tarot cards, while criticizing the series' character design. Silverman gave the same rating to the second half, concluding that "Overall, however, what began as a difficult show to classify ends on a satisfying note, with problems resolved thanks to the inner strength of Akari and her friends as much as by their magical powers. It isn't as well done as some other magical girl shows, but Day Break Illusion manages to turn itself into a story worth watching as it comes full circle to resolve the problems it opened with."

References

External links
 Official anime website 
 Official franchise website 
 

2013 anime television series debuts
2013 Japanese novels
2013 manga
Anime International Company
Anime with original screenplays
Aniplex franchises
Japanese webcomics
Kadokawa Shoten manga
Light novels
Magical girl anime and manga
Gangan Online manga
Webcomics in print
Tokyo MX original programming